Carlos Alberto Dario de Oliveira, usually known as Alfinete, (born February 1, 1961) is a retired professional Brazilian footballer who played as a right back for several Campeonato Brasileiro Série A clubs.

Nickname
Carlos Alberto Dario de Oliveira was nicknamed Alfinete because he was very thin and wore a black power hairstyle, making him look like a pin.

Playing career
Alfinete started his career playing for XV de Jaú, but after four years he moved to Corinthians, where, as a member of the Corinthians Democracy, scored 3 goals in 107 matches played for the club. He played for Grêmio from 1987 to 1991, winning the Copa do Brasil in 1989 and the Campeonato Gaúcho four times, returning to the Porto Alegre club in 1993. Alfinete won the Campeonato Mineiro in 1991 and the Copa CONMEBOL in 1992 while playing for Atlético Mineiro. In 1994, playing for Fluminense, he retired.

Managerial career
He started his managerial career in 1996, when he was hired as XV de Jaú's head coach, after being Cilinho's assistant manager. He managed several Goiás state clubs, such as Rioverdense, Itumbiara and Grêmio Anápolis.

Honors
Alfinete won the following honors during his playing career:

References

1961 births
Living people
Brazilian footballers
Brazilian football managers
Esporte Clube XV de Novembro (Jaú) players
Sport Club Corinthians Paulista players
Associação Atlética Ponte Preta players
Joinville Esporte Clube players
Grêmio Foot-Ball Porto Alegrense players
Clube Atlético Mineiro players
Ituano FC players
Vila Nova Futebol Clube players
Fluminense FC players
Anápolis Futebol Clube managers
Itumbiara Esporte Clube managers
Brasiliense Futebol Clube managers
Santa Helena Esporte Clube managers
Esporte Clube Noroeste managers
Associação Atlética Anapolina managers
Esporte Clube Avenida managers
Association football fullbacks
Grêmio Esportivo Anápolis managers
Footballers from São Paulo (state)
People from Jales